Non Sa-at is a district (amphoe) in the southern part of Udon Thani province, northeastern Thailand.

Geography
Neighboring districts are (from the north clockwise) Nong Saeng and Kumphawapi of Udon Thani Province, Kranuan, Nam Phong, and Khao Suan Kwang of Khon Kaen province.

History
The minor district (king amphoe) was established on 21 January 1974, when the three tambons, Non Sa-at, Pho Si Samran, and Bung Kaeo, were split off from Kumphawapi district. It was upgraded to a full district on 12 April 1977.

Administration
The district is divided into six sub-districts (tambons), which are further subdivided into 63 villages (mubans). Non Sa-at is a township (thesaban tambon) which covers parts of tambon Non Sa-at. There are a further six tambon administrative organizations (TAO).

References

External links
amphoe.com

Non Sa-at